Him Kerosene was a Swedish 1990s alternative rock band founded in Luleå.

History
Him Kerosene started in 1991, at first playing pop music inspired by The Beatles and The Smiths, although the band would be later be known for a harder and more dynamic sound. The band's home town Luleå had plenty of rehearsal studios and several bands were around, with members from one band often contributing to another. This was especially clear in the case of Him Kerosene, which during its lifetime saw members from several other famous Swedish bands. Two of the members in the first lineup, Kristofer Åström and Pelle Gunnerfeldt, were from the prominent hardcore band Fireside and this increased media attention.

In 1995 local record company Ampersand Records released Him Kerosene's first album Recorder. Bear Quartet members Johan Forsling and Mattias Alkberg contributed with some of the music and lyrics. Forsling also became a Him Kerosene member for a brief period, replacing Kristofer Åström as he and Pelle Gunnerfeldt left the band.

After releasing the EP Caper on Birdnest Records and playing at several festivals during 1996, Him Kerosene got a new record deal with Telegram Records. The single Loser Outfit, the EP Whatever Gets You By and finally the album Start. Stop. followed. At the time the band consisted of Niklas Quintana and Nils Renberg - the backbone of the band - together with two newer members: Tomas Turunen and Anders Ekström. Ekström was another proof that the music scene in Luleå was tight - he came from hardcore band Breach, where also Niklas Quintana had a past.

Sales figures were a disappointment and Telegram Records dropped the band. Him Kerosene released one more EP, No Mend No Repair on label Chalksounds, before finally splitting up. Since then, band members have stayed in the music industry. For instance, Pelle Gunnerfeldt has produced music for The Hives and Kristofer Åström has pursued a solo career - both of them have also kept playing in Fireside. Niklas Quintana and Tomas Turunen went back to Breach, and later formed the band The End Will Be Kicks.

Discography
Him Kerosene played energetic, melodious high-tempo rock with hardcore influences. They once described their music as "punk for the working class".

Albums

EPs

Singles

Music videos
Whatever Gets you By
Raisins

References

External links
Him Kerosene homepage on archive.org, 1997
Him Kerosene interview from Svenska Dagbladet (Swedish) on archive.org, 1997
Retrospect review of Recorder (Swedish), dagensskiva.com, 2003

Swedish musical groups
People from Luleå